Fonkia is a monotypic genus of flowering plants belonging to the family Plantaginaceae. The only species is Fonkia uliginosa.

It is native to Chile and south-western Argentina. 

The genus is named after Francisco Fonk (1830–1912), a Chilean doctor. The epithet of uliginosa is from the Latin word, of marshes; from uligo meaning dampness.
It was first described and published in Linnaea Vol.30 on page 198 in 1860.

References

Plantaginaceae
Plantaginaceae genera
Monotypic Lamiales genera
Plants described in 1860
Flora of Chile
Flora of Argentina